Hello Trouble may refer to:
 Hello Trouble (song), a song by Orville Couch, and by the Desert Rose Band
 Hello Trouble (1918 film), an American silent comedy film
 Hello Trouble (1932 film), an American Western film